Scrobipalpa dorsoflava is a moth of the family Gelechiidae. It is found in Russia (southern Ural) and Kyrgyzstan (Issyk Kul).

References

Moths described in 1996
Scrobipalpa